Al-Murabba is a historic neighborhood and a subject of Baladiyah al-Malaz in Riyadh, Saudi Arabia. Spanned across 4.88 square kilometers, it shares borders with the al-Wizarat and al-Malazz neighborhoods to the east, an-Namudhajiyah neighborhood to the west and al-Futah neighborhood to the south. Its name reportedly comes from a broken square-shaped dry well around which the Murabba Palace was built and from where latter's name gets derived as well.

History 
After the unification of Saudi Arabia, King Abdulaziz ordered building of palaces outside the former city walls of Old Riyadh, marking one of the preludes for the subsequent expansions of Riyadh. One of the places he chose was in the Murabba neighborhood in 1937 to build the Murabba Palace. According to Saudi historian Mansour al-Assaf, there was a square-shaped dry well in the neighborhood, from which the area derives its name 'al-Murabba' (lit. the square). In 1969, the Riyadh Water Tower was inaugurated in the neighborhood. In 1999, the King Abdulaziz Historical Center which contained the Abdulaziz's former Murabba Palace and the National Museum was inaugurated by King Fahd to commemorate the 100th anniversary (in terms of Hijri calendar) of Abdulaziz's capturing of Riyadh in 1902.

Gallery

See also 

 Al Batha, Riyadh
 Al Malazz (Riyadh)
 King Abdulaziz Historical Center

References 

Neighbourhoods in Riyadh